The Ellipse 360 is a residential skyscraper located in Tamsui District, New Taipei, Taiwan. Construction began in 2010 and it was completed in 2012. The building offers 37 apartment units, with facilities including a banquet hall, two swimming pools and a fitness center for the residents. Ellipse 360 is the only residential building in Asia designed by I.M. Pei. The exterior was originally intended to be a circular structure, but I.M. Pei wanted to present a 360-degree view of mountains and rivers. Therefore, the ellipse design was adopted to extend the window surface. Due to the overall elliptical arc, the angle of view varies from location to location.

See also 
 List of tallest buildings in Taiwan
 List of tallest buildings in New Taipei City
 Blue Ocean (skyscraper)

References

2012 establishments in Taiwan
Apartment buildings in Taiwan
Residential buildings completed in 2012
Residential skyscrapers in Taiwan
Skyscrapers in New Taipei